Dr. Brooks A. Keel is President of Augusta University and Chief Executive Officer of AU Health System.

Background
The University System of Georgia Board of Regents announced the selection of Brooks A. Keel, Ph.D. as President of Augusta University and CEO of AU Health on July 8, 2015, and he began serving on July 20.

Prior to his selection to lead Augusta University, he served as the 12th president of Georgia Southern University beginning January 4, 2010.

Keel was born, raised, and educated in Augusta, Georgia. Before serving as president at Georgia Southern, Keel served as the vice chancellor of research and economic development at Louisiana State University in Baton Rouge, Louisiana.

Notes

External links
 Announcement Press Release (7/8/2015)
 President's page on the Georgia Regents University website

Heads of universities and colleges in the United States
Living people
Louisiana State University faculty
People from Augusta, Georgia
Georgia Health Sciences University alumni
Augusta State University alumni
Georgia Southern University
Year of birth missing (living people)